Spring is a music album released by Norwegian musician Finn Coren in 1997. All the songs are texts by William Blake with music by Coren.

Track listing
"The Ecchoing Green" - 2:57
"The Garden of Love" - 3:11
"Spring" - 3:03
"The Fly" - 4:00
"The Tyger" - 3:03
"London" - 3:14
"The Chimney Sweeper" - 4:43
"The Voice of the Ancient Bard" - 3:18
"Holy Thursday pt one (Innocence)" - 3:55
"Holy Thursday pt two (Experience)" - 3:14
Silent Melancholy" - 3:19
"The Divine Image" - 3:57
"The Little Boy Lost" - 2:49
"The Little Boy Found" - 3:47
"Infant Sorrow" - 1:46
"Cradle Song" - 3:19
"A Dream" - 3:42
"To Tirzah" - 4:00
"Jerusalem" - 5:51
"The Sick Rose" - 2:55

A follow-up album, Spring: The Appendix was released in 1998.

References

1997 albums
Musical settings of poems by William Blake